Arthur William Pentelow (14 February 1924 – 6 August 1991) was an English actor who was best known for playing Henry Wilks in Emmerdale Farm (later renamed Emmerdale), appearing from the first episode in 1972 until 1991.

Early career
Born in Rochdale, Lancashire, Pentelow's love of drama began while he was studying Shakespeare at grammar school, but he started his working life as a cadet clerk in the local police force. He later served in World War II in the Royal Navy and did radar work in Normandy. After peace was declared, Pentelow returned to Rochdale, where he became a student teacher. He started acting as an amateur with the Curtain Theatre Company, before becoming a member of the Bradford Civic Playhouse Theatre School. Between his theatre work he sold ice-cream and delivered laundry. He later went on to work in repertory theatre at the Bristol Old Vic, Guildford and Northampton, before joining the company at Birmingham, where his fellow actors included Derek Jacobi, Rosemary Leach and Albert Finney.

Film and television career
Pentelow appeared in a number of films during his career, these included, Charlie Bubbles, Privilege, and The Peace Game. He also made appearances in popular television programmes, such as, Z-Cars, The Troubleshooters, Emergency - Ward 10 and Hadleigh.

Prior to appearing in the soap opera Emmerdale Farm when it began in 1972, he had already appeared in Coronation Street as an old friend of Hilda Ogden, played by the actress Jean Alexander, as well as a sporting serial called United! as the football supporters' club chairman. Pentelow also appeared in 1969's notorious gangland series for Granada "Big Breadwinner Hog" as the unflappable Detective Inspector Walker, one of the CID team on the trail of the trendy, up-and-coming gangland boss Hogarth of the title.

The character of Henry Wilks in Emmerdale Farm was a retired Bradford wool merchant, who became a director of Emmerdale Farm when it became a limited company. He also became a joint owner of the village public house - the Woolpack. His partnership with the landlord, Amos Brearly, played by actor Ronald Magill, added a humorous dimension to the soap opera for almost 20 years. Due to Pentelow's sudden death, the character was killed off in October 1991. He died in the ambulance on the way to hospital from Emmerdale Farm.

Later years
Pentelow was often described as a modest and unassuming man by his fellow actors. It was a great shock when he died suddenly of a heart attack at the age of 67, whilst driving from his family home in Birmingham to commence filming Emmerdale back in Bradford and Leeds.

Personal life
Pentelow was married to Jacqueline, whom he had met when they were both studying acting.  They had two sons - Nicholas and Simon. Their son Nick was one of the saxophone players for glam-rock band Wizzard.

Filmography

References

External links
 

1924 births
1991 deaths
English male television actors
Royal Navy personnel of World War II
People from Rochdale
20th-century English male actors